Orthodox Communion may refer to:

 Eastern Orthodox Church
 Oriental Orthodox Churches
 Communion of Western Orthodox Churches

See also
 Orthodox (disambiguation)
 Orthodox Church (disambiguation)
 Communion (disambiguation)
 Eastern Orthodox Church organization